Goldie and the Boxer is a made-for-television film starring O. J. Simpson.  The production was broadcast on the NBC television network on December 30, 1979.

While being panned by critics, it was a solid ratings hit and led to a sequel, Goldie and the Boxer Go to Hollywood (1981).

Plot
Joe Gallagher is a down-on-his luck boxer whose life and career undergo a change when an orphaned, little girl named Goldie is left in his care.

Cast
O. J. Simpson - Joe Gallagher
Melissa Michaelsen - Goldie Kellog
Vincent Gardenia - Diamond
Phil Silvers - Wally
Ned Glass - Al Levinsky
Gordon Jump  - Alex
Judyann Elder - Bernette Wilson
Judy Landers - Bonnie
Madlyn Rhue - Marsha
Annazette Chase - Anne
Claude Earl Jones - Willie 
Fran Ryan - Cook

References

External links

1979 television films
1979 films
1979 drama films
American boxing films
American drama television films
Films about race and ethnicity
Films scored by Jimmie Haskell
NBC network original films
1970s American films